The Midwestern Sectional Figure Skating Championships is an annual figure skating competition sanctioned by U.S. Figure Skating. It is one of three sectional competitions alongside the Eastern Sectional Figure Skating Championships and Pacific Coast Sectional Figure Skating Championships. 

Skaters compete in five levels: Senior, Junior, Novice, Intermediate, and Juvenile.  Medals are awarded in four disciplines: Women's singles, Men's singles, Pairs, and Ice dance.  Medals are given out in four colors: gold (first), silver (second), bronze (third), and pewter (fourth).  Skaters who place in the top four at the Midwestern Sectional advance to the U.S. Figure Skating Championships.

Senior medalists

Men

Women

Pairs

Ice dancing

Junior medalists

Men

Women

Pairs

Ice Dance

References

External links
1999 Midwestern Sectional Championships
2002 Midwestern Sectional Championships
2003 Midwestern Sectional Championships
2004 Midwestern Sectional Championships
2005 Midwestern Sectional Championships
2006 Midwestern Sectional Championships
2007 Midwestern Sectional Championships
2008 Midwestern Sectional Championships
2009 Midwestern Sectional Championships
2010 Midwestern Sectional Championships
2011 Midwestern Sectional Championships
2012 Midwestern Sectional Championships

Figure skating competitions
Midwestern Sectional
Sports in the Midwestern United States